Immunity is the fourth studio album by English electronic musician and producer Jon Hopkins. It was released on 3 June 2013 by Domino Records to critical acclaim and was nominated for the 2013 Mercury Prize for best album.

Production
Among the artists that contributed vocals were long-time collaborator King Creosote, and Corin Roddick and Megan James of the band Purity Ring. It was recorded and produced in Hopkins's London studio, with Hopkins often using homemade sound effects or the natural sound of the room.

Promotion
On 6 March 2013, Hopkins announced that his fourth solo album Immunity would be released by Domino Records on 3 June in the UK, and 4 June in the US. A trailer for the album featuring a snippet of the track "Collider" from the album was made available through YouTube. The first single "Open Eye Signal" was uploaded on Pitchforks YouTube channel on 24 April 2013. The hour-long Immunity was released on 3 June 2013 by Domino Recording Company in London, on vinyl, CD, and digitally. Immunity peaked at number 67 on the UK Albums Chart and at number 12 on the UK Dance Albums Chart. It also peaked at number 13 on Billboards Top Dance/Electronic Albums chart. In Britain, it was also nominated for the 2013 Mercury Prize for best album.

Critical reception

Immunity met with a largely positive reception. It received a cumulative score of 82 out of 100 on Metacritic, indicating "universal acclaim". Stated Mixmag, "Immunity is an album of organic techno and exquisite mini-symphonies."

Several reviews focused on the cohesiveness of the tracks. Stated The Observer, the album "lasts exactly an hour but feels much longer. This isn't a criticism: in eight vivid, atmospheric tracks, Immunity captures the feel of an epic night out. Hopkins's beats shuffle and trip but there is a great clarity of focus throughout, and a delicate beauty." Stated MusicOMH, "It is that rarest of things in 2013, an album which demands to be listened to as a whole and indeed functions best as an hour-long work of art."

Most reviews praised the emotional and introspective nature of the album. Stated XLR8R, there is a "Brian Eno-esque atmosphere that appears throughout Immunity, a kind of angelic presence touching every track and even making Hopkins' more brooding efforts introspective in a very powerful way." MusicOMH also called it "an intelligent and deeply human album" and a "modern classic."

AllMusic gave it a largely positive review, stating "Some of Immunity'''s most impressive moments expand on the blend of rhythm and atmosphere Hopkins emphasized on Insides... the album still reflects how Hopkins' polished approach is something of a blessing and a curse. Immunity shows how he's grown, in his subtle, accomplished way... yet its tracks occasionally feel like the surroundings for a focal point that never arrives." In contrast, Pitchfork described Immunity as a "remarkably visceral, sensual, confident electronic record that stays absorbing from beginning to end."

In 2017, Pitchfork'' placed the album at number 37 on its list of "The 50 Best IDM Albums of All Time".

Track listing

Personnel
Jon Hopkins – composition, production, primary artist
Sarah Jones – drums
Emma Smith – vocals, violin
Lisa Elle – vocals
Vince Sipprell – vocals
King Creosote – vocals
Megan James – vocals
Corin Roddick – engineering
Cherif Hashizume – engineering
Rik Simpson – mixing
Guy Davie – mastering
Linden Gledhill – artwork
Craig Ward – artwork

Charts

References

External links
Immunity on Billboard

2013 albums
Jon Hopkins albums
Domino Recording Company albums
Albums produced by Jon Hopkins